The 51st General Assembly of Nova Scotia represented Nova Scotia between 1974 and August 12, 1978.

Division of seats

There were 46 members of the General Assembly, elected in the 1974 Nova Scotia general election.

List of members

Former members of the 51st General Assembly

References 

Terms of the General Assembly of Nova Scotia
1974 establishments in Nova Scotia
1978 disestablishments in Nova Scotia
20th century in Nova Scotia